The Christian Democratic Party was a political party in Jamaica. It first contested national elections in 1972, but received only 109 votes and failed to win a seat. It did not contest any further elections.

References

Defunct political parties in Jamaica
Defunct Christian political parties